Axiidea is an infraorder of decapod crustaceans. They are colloquially known as mud shrimp, ghost shrimp, or burrowing shrimp; however, these decapods are only distantly related to true shrimp. Axiidea and Gebiidea are divergent infraoders of the former infraorder Thalassinidea. These infraorders have converged ecologically and morphologically as burrowing forms.  Based on molecular evidence as of 2009, it is now widely believed that these two infraorders represent two distinct lineages separate from one another.  Since this is a recent change, much of the literature and research surrounding these infraorders still refers to the Axiidea and Gebiidea in combination as "thalassinidean" for the sake of clarity and reference. This division based on molecular evidence is consistent with the groupings proposed by Robert Gurney in 1938 based on larval developmental stages.

Axiidea are noted for the burrows with complex architecture that they make in the ocean floor sediment. These burrows can be classified based on their external characteristics in the sediment as well as the trophic group that the species falls into. The population density of most species of Axiidea tends to be high, so these organisms play an important role in the biogeochemical processes of the ocean floor sediments, and in the creation of habitats that favor various marine benthic communities.

Classification
The infraorder Axiidea belongs to the group Reptantia, which consists of the walking/crawling decapods (lobsters and crabs).  The cladogram below shows Axiidea as more basal than Gebiidea within the larger order Decapoda, from analysis by Wolfe et al., 2019.

The infraorder Axiidea comprises the following families:

Axiidae Huxley, 1879
Callianassidae Dana, 1852
Callianideidae Kossmann, 1880
Ctenochelidae Manning and Felder, 1991
Gourretiidae
Micheleidae Sakai, 1992
Strahlaxiidae Poore, 1994

A few subfamilies of Axiidea have been proposed to become families, but have not for a variety of reasons. Examples of these subfamilies include the subfamily Gourretiidae, discovered by Sakai in 1999. Gourretiidae is a subfamily of the Ctenochelidae, and has been proposed to become a family instead, but phylogenetic analyses do not yet support that proposal. Similarly, molecular studies do not support the subfamily Eiconaxiidae being separate from family Axiidae. There is also no molecular evidence to separate the subfamily Calocardidae from Axiidae.

The cladogram below shows Axiidea's internal family relationships from analysis by Wolfe et al., 2019.

Description

The color of the Axiidea can range a variety of colors, including white, pink, red, orange, and dark brown. The rostrum can range from being nearly invisible, to fairly rigid and extending past the eyes. The carapace also ranges from fairly rigid to transparent, showing the organs underneath. Axiidea can range from having a well-calcified exoskeleton, to barely calcified elongated exoskeletons, which show an adaptation to burrowing in certain species.

The sex of the Axiidea can be determined by the pleopod structure on the underbelly of the organism. This structure is underdeveloped or absent in the males. The sex ratio in most species of Axiidea tends to be 1:1, although in certain habitats one sex can slightly outnumber the other.

Duration of egg incubation periods, and therefore also larval development, is dependent on the environmental factors surrounding the habitat of each individual species. Environmental factors tend to include developmental constraints, salinity of the marine environment, and temperature of the water. Furthermore, the duration of the zoeal, or larval, phase ranges quite a bit, and has been estimated to last as little as 2 to 3 days in some species of Axiidea, to 5 to 6 months in other species. The pre-zoeal hatching stage is marked by poor swimming ability and lack of setae, and the zoeal stages are planktonic. The megalopa stage represents the transition from plankton to their benthic habitats, and morphological development is marked by the growth of functional mouthparts resembling those of juveniles or adults.

Burrows
Burrows can be divided into two groups in terms of external characteristics, depending on the existence of a mound of sediment around the entrance of the burrow. These two groups can be further divided based on whether they contain plant material within the burrow. Burrows tend to be narrow, and can range from Y or U shaped in certain species, to intricate branching tunnels and deep wells in other species.

Burrows can also differ within the classifications of external characteristics, based on the feeding mode for each organism. There are three general trophic groups that the families within the infraorder Axiidea can fall into. The first trophic group are the detritophages, or deposit feeders. The other two trophic groups are the drift catchers, which collect plant matter that drifts based on ocean currents, and the suspension feeders, which feed on plant matter that is suspended in the water.

Drift catcher burrows tend to lack the external characteristic of the mound around the entrance of the burrow, and their burrows tend to be very deep and contain chambers that are filled with seagrasses and other sea debris. Suspension feeder burrows tend to be in the Y or U shapes, and also lack seagrasses and debris within them in contrast to the drift catchers; furthermore, the sediment within the lower parts of these burrows can also serve as food for the suspension feeders. The feeding mode affects the burrow, because Axiidea consume amounts of sediment, and the sediment that is rejected makes up parts of the burrow. The seagrasses consumed by the Axiidea are therefore present in the burrows and provide a way to classify the species. The burrows created by detritophage species of Axiidea are more likely to change over the life of the organism than the burrows of filter feeders because detritophage species of Axiidea can build new passages and chambers over the course of their feeding.

Each burrow is typically inhabited by one organism, however, certain species of Axiidea live in pairs.

Distribution and ecology
Axiidea typically live in marine environments with soft-bottom sediments. Axiidea are found in most oceans and seas, except for high latitude polar seas. Distribution shows a clear gradient based on latitude, with low species numbers at higher latitudes and higher species numbers in low latitudes. Therefore, Axiidea are most diverse in temperate to tropical regions. Within the intertidal regions, Axiidea can be used as fishing bait or even for human consumption.

References

Thalassinidea
Arthropod infraorders